Harutiun Alpiar (July 12, 1864 in Smyrna, Ottoman Empire - April 5, 1919) was an Ottoman Armenian journalist and humorous writer. 

He used the pseudonyms Chrysanthemum and Radames. He received his education in Constantinople. He lived in Italy, France, and Egypt, where he edited the magazine Paros. He has written satirical novels and was the author of "Fantazio"(1913) which was a collection of his works. A large part of his work is still scattered in magazines.

References

People from İzmir
Smyrniote Armenians
Ethnic Armenian journalists
19th-century Armenian writers
1864 births
1919 deaths
19th-century journalists from the Ottoman Empire
20th-century journalists from the Ottoman Empire